The Queensland Government Savings Bank was a bank in Queensland, Australia. It was operated by the Queensland Government. It was also known as the Government Savings Bank of Queensland.

History 
The Queensland Government Savings Bank was established by one of the earliest pieces of legislation enacted by the government of the new colony of Queensland in 1861. Intended to encourage small deposit saving by working people, savings banks could be established by the gazettal of an application by ten or more house or landholders in any community of more than 500 people. In 1864, the Government Savings Bank Bill provided a government guarantee to protect trustees and deposits and to allow depositors to easily transfer accounts from one town to another.

Over time it absorbed the:
 Moreton Bay Savings Bank (1856-1865)
 Ipswich Savings Bank (1861-1866)
 Toowoomba Savings Bank (1862-1867)
The Commonwealth Bank of Australia was founded under the Commonwealth Bank Act of 1911. This empowered the Bank to transact both savings and trading business under the security of a guarantee from the Federal government. It opened its first branch for business on 15 July 1912 in Melbourne and soon opened agencies in post offices throughout Victoria. The Queensland branch was opened on 16 September 1912. Post offices were used as agencies throughout the country as they had been transferred to Commonwealth control after Federation. The Queensland Government Savings Bank merged with the Commonwealth Bank of Australia, transferring the business and assets on 8 December 1920 .

Notable buildings 
Notable buildings occupied by the bank include:
 Commonwealth Bank Building, Mount Morgan
 Family Services Building, Brisbane
 Gympie Lands Office, Gympie

References

Attribution 

 
Articles incorporating text from the Queensland Heritage Register
Banks established in 1861
1861 establishments in Australia
Banks disestablished in 1920
1920 disestablishments in Australia
1920 mergers and acquisitions